3-Methylenecyclopropene, also called methylenecyclopropene or triafulvene, is a hydrocarbon with chemical formula . It is a colourless gas that polymerizes readily as a liquid or in solution but is stable as a gas. This highly strained and reactive molecule was synthesized and characterized for the first time in 1984, and has been the subject of considerable experimental and theoretical interest.  It is an example of a cross-conjugated alkene, being composed of cyclopropene with an exocyclic double bond attached.

Description
Methylenecyclopropene is the smallest of the fulvenes (a family of unstable, cyclic molecules, conjugated transversally with an odd number of carbon atoms in the ring).

The structure of methylenecyclopropene has two interacting double bonds, which represents the simplest transversally conjugated π-bonding system. It is fundamentally not an alternant hydrocarbon. The value of its dipole moment (which is around four times that of pentafulvene) can be calculated by the Hückel method (HMO).

Its study has involved the use of isotopic isomers.

Reactivity
Most fulvenes are typically non-aromatic in nature (based on spectroscopic data), having properties closer to alkenes. In the case of tria- and pentafulvene, the possibility of dipole forms of resonance suggests an aromatic character to the cyclic structure; furthermore, as opposed to pentafulvene, one of the triafulvene resonance structures has a negative charge on the methylidene carbon.
 
Similarly to heptafulvene (fulvene containing a 7-atom cyclic ring), triafulvene polymerizes easily at −20 °C and is stabilized by electron-accepting groups bonded to the methylidene carbon atom.

See also
Methylenecyclopropane
Cyclopropene
Cyclopropane
Fulvene
Cyclopropenone
Methylene group

References

External links

Hydrocarbons
Cyclopropenes
Vinylidene compounds